Fareed Mahfooz Kidwai is an Indian politician and a member of 18th Legislative Assembly of Uttar Pradesh representing Ram Nagar since March 2022. He is a member of the Samajwadi Party. Kidwai had previously represented Masauli as a member of Bahujan Samaj Party in the 15th, and Kursi in the 16th Uttar Pradesh Assembly as a Samajwadi Party candidate.

Personal life
Kidwai was born to Mahfooz Ahmad and hails from Zaidpur town of Uttar Pradesh. He completed his Master of Science in biology from Aligarh Muslim University in 1966. Kidwai is an agriculturalist by profession.

Political career
As a member of Bahujan Samaj Party, Kidwai was elected as the Member of Legislative Assembly from Masauli constituency in the 2007 Uttar Pradesh Legislative Assembly election, after he defeated IJP's Rakesh Kumar Verma by 5,364 votes. However, in 2011, before completion of the five-year term, Kidwai left Bahujan Samaj Party to rejoin Samajwadi Party.

Representing Kursi constituency in the 2012 election, Kidwai was able to defeat Bahujan Samaj Party's Kumari Meeta Gautam by a margin of 23,937 votes. But in the 2017 election, an incumbent Kidwai lost to Bharatiya Janta Party candidate Sakendra Pratap Verma by margin of 28,679 votes.

In the 2022 Uttar Pradesh Legislative Assembly election, Kidwai representing Samajwadi Party as a candidate from Ram Nagar constituency, went on to defeat Bharatiya Janata Party's incumbent MLA Sharad Kumar Awasthi by a small margin of 261 votes.

References

1940s births
Living people
Samajwadi Party politicians from Uttar Pradesh
Uttar Pradesh MLAs 2007–2012
Uttar Pradesh MLAs 2012–2017
Uttar Pradesh MLAs 2022–2027
People from Barabanki district
Year of birth missing (living people)